Sauret-Besserve is a commune in the Puy-de-Dôme department in Auvergne-Rhône-Alpes in central France.

See also
 Fades viaduct
Communes of the Puy-de-Dôme department

References

Sauretbesserve
Puy-de-Dôme communes articles needing translation from French Wikipedia